The Battle of Otlukbeli or Otluk Beli was a battle between Aq Qoyunlu and the Ottoman Empire that was fought on August 11, 1473.

Background 
In autumn of 1463, Republic of Venice opened negotiations with Uzun Hasan. In 1464, Uzun Hasan intervened in central Anatolian affairs. Although Mehmed occupied Karaman in 1468, he was unable to subjugate a number of Turkoman tribes living in the mountains which extended to the Mediterranean coast. These tribes were not subdued for the next fifty years, and from time to time rose in revolt around pretenders to the throne of Karamanids. After the Ottoman occupation of Karaman, Uzun Hasan adopted a more aggressive policy. By 1471, the problem of Karaman had become a serious threat to the Ottoman power. Uzun Hasan formed alliance with the Venetians and established contacts with the Knights of Rhodes, Kingdom of Cyprus and the Bey of Alaiye. He also intended to establish a direct contact with Venice by marching on the Mediterranean coast through the Taurus mountains, then controlled by the Turkoman tribes. Although a few Venetian ships landed on the coast, they could not find Uzun Hasan's men. In 1472, a crusader fleet attacked the Ottoman coasts. Uzun Hasan with Karamanid forces drove the Ottomans from Karaman and marched on Bursa. However, Mehmed repulsed the invasion, and formed an army of 70,000 men. In addition to his regular army, he had mercenaries from his Muslim and Christian subjects.

Battle 

Mehmed II returned with his army in 1473 to defeat Uzun Hasan. The Turkomans had a traditional army that contained considerable amounts of light cavalry. On the other hand, the Ottoman army exploited the latest technology available at the time. They arrived with handguns and cannons. This difference between the natures of the two armies marked the result of the battle. The Ottoman side gained a decisive victory, whereas the Turkoman army was nearly destroyed in a single day.

Aftermath 
From  he sent a series of letters announcing his victory, including an unusual missive in the Uyghur language addressed to the Turkomans of Anatolia.

Ibn Kemal made the following statement on the capture of :

Abu Bakr Tihrani in the Kitab-i Diyarbakriyya:

Ottomans nearly destroyed the power of the Aq Qoyunlu in the East. Aq Qoyunlu would be destroyed completely by Ismail I in later. This victory of the Safavid Empire would create a new enemy for the Ottoman Empire in the East. The race between the two empires ended with the fall of the Safavid dynasty from power in the 18th century.

See also
Battle of Otlukbeli Martyrs' Monument

Primary sources
 Târîh-i Ebü’l-Feth, Tursun Beg
 Tevārīḫ-i Āl-i ʿOsmān, Aşıkpaşazade
 Tevārīḫ-i Āl-i ʿOsmān, Ibn Kemal
 Cihannümâ, Neşri

References 

Otlukbeli
Otlukbeli
Otlukbeli
History of Erzincan Province
1473 in the Ottoman Empire
Otlukbeli